Montbray is a commune in the Manche department in Normandy in north-western France.

The village has an ancient château which belongs to the commune and houses the town hall and the village nursery school. The village also has a church, a bar, a bakery, a garage and a children's play area with picnic tables and a pond.

See also
Communes of the Manche department

References

Communes of Manche